Halloween II is a 2009 American slasher film written, directed, and produced by Rob Zombie. The film is a sequel to Zombie's 2007 remake of 1978's Halloween and the tenth installment in the Halloween franchise. The story follows Laurie Strode as she deals with the aftermath of the previous film's events, Dr. Loomis who is trying to capitalize on those events with a new book, and Michael Myers as he seeks to reunite with his sister. The film sees the return of lead cast members from the 2007 film Malcolm McDowell, Scout Taylor-Compton, and Tyler Mane, who portray Dr. Loomis, Laurie Strode, and Michael Myers, respectively.

For Halloween II, Zombie decided to focus more on the connection between Strode and Myers, and the idea that they share similar psychological problems. He wanted the sequel to be more realistic and violent than its 2007 predecessor, and to portray how the events of the first film affected the characters. Zombie also wanted to provide a glimpse into each character's psyche. Filming primarily took place in Georgia, which provided Zombie with a tax incentive as well as the visual look he was going for. When it came time to provide a musical score, Zombie had trouble finding a place to include John Carpenter's original Halloween theme music, and it was only included in the final shot.

Halloween II was released on August 28, 2009, in North America, and was met with a negative reception from critics. On October 30, 2009, it was re-released in North America to coincide with the Halloween holiday weekend. The original opening of the film grossed less than the 2007 remake, with approximately $7 million. It would go on to underperform at the box office, only grossing $39.4 million worldwide against a $15 million budget. Rob Zombie declined to return to film another sequel, and the next installment, Halloween 3D, was cancelled in 2012. Halloween II is the final Halloween film to be distributed by Dimension Films. It was followed by Halloween in 2018, a direct sequel to the original 1978 film produced by Blumhouse Productions and distributed by Universal Pictures.

Plot
During his time in Smith's Grove Sanitarium, a young Michael Myers is visited by his mother Deborah who gives him a white horse statuette as a gift.

Fifteen years later, Laurie Strode is wandering around in shock after having shot an older Michael. Sheriff Lee Brackett finds Laurie and takes her to the hospital. Meanwhile, the paramedics pick up Annie Brackett and Michael's psychiatrist Dr. Sam Loomis, who survived being attacked by Michael, and also take them to the hospital. Michael's body is taken in another ambulance. When the driver has a traffic accident, Michael awakens and escapes, killing a paramedic injured in the accident.

One year later, Laurie is now living with the Bracketts. Michael has been missing and is presumed dead. While Laurie deals with her trauma, Dr. Loomis has chosen to turn the event into an opportunity to write another book. Elsewhere, Michael, who is still alive and living as a drifter, has been having visions of his mother's ghost and a younger version of himself, who instruct him to reunite with Laurie. Michael arrives at a farm and kills the owners before he sets off for Haddonfield. As Michael travels to Haddonfield, Laurie begins having hallucinations that mirrored Michael's past. Her hallucinations also begin to include her acting out Michael's murders. Meanwhile, Loomis goes on tour to promote his new book, only to be criticized by the public, who blame him for Michael's actions and for exploiting the deaths of Michael's victims. When Loomis' book is released, Laurie discovers that she is really Angel Myers, Michael's long-lost sister. She goes to a Halloween party with her co-workers, Mya and Harley, to escape how she is feeling.

Michael appears at the party and kills Harley, then goes to the Brackett house and fatally wounds Annie. When Laurie and Mya return to the house, they find Annie, who dies in Laurie's arms. Michael kills Mya and then comes after Laurie, who manages to escape. Sheriff Brackett arrives home and finds his daughter dead. Laurie flags down a car, but Michael kills the driver and flips the car over with Laurie still inside. Michael then takes the unconscious Laurie to an abandoned shed. Laurie awakens to her hallucinations with Deborah, seen by both her and Michael, who asks for her to call her "mommy".

The police discover Michael's location and surround the shed. Loomis arrives and goes inside to try to reason with Michael but when he tries to resuscitate Laurie from her hallucinations, Michael grabs Loomis and stabs him to death before being shot through the cabin window by Brackett and impaled on a rake. Apparently released from her visions, Laurie walks over to Michael and stabs him to death with his own knife. The shed door opens and Laurie walks out wearing Michael's mask. Later, Laurie sits in isolation in a psychiatric ward, grinning as Deborah's ghost approaches with the horse statuette.

Cast

Production

Development

In 2008, at the 30 Years of Terror Convention, Halloween producer Malek Akkad confirmed that a sequel to Rob Zombie's 2007 film was in the works. Despite French filmmakers Julien Maury and Alexandre Bustillo being in negotiations to direct the sequel in November 2008, Rob Zombie took on the duty and was also writer.

In an interview, Zombie expressed how the exhaustion of creating the first Halloween made him not want to come back for a sequel, but after a year of cooling down he was more open to the idea. The writer/director explained that with the sequel he was no longer bound by a sense of needing to retain any "John Carpenter-ness", as he "felt free to do whatever". Producer Malek Akkad said the original intention, when they believed Zombie was not returning, was to create a "normal sequel". Akkad and his Trancus producing company hired various writers to come up with drafts for a new film, but none worked. Akkad and the Weinstein brothers then turned to Bustillo and Muary, whose film Inside had recently been bought for distribution by the Weinstein Company. According to Akkad, the producers really wanted Zombie to return, as Akkad felt that there was something "lost in the translation" when the French filmmakers took over the project. After his work on the 2007 remake, Zombie had earned the trust of Akkad, who told him to ignore any rules they had set for him on the previous film. Akkad said that he wanted Zombie to move the franchise away from some of its established rules.

Characters
For the sequel, Mane, McDowell, Taylor-Compton, Harris, Moon Zombie, and Dourif returned to the roles of Michael Myers, Dr. Loomis, Laurie Strode, Annie Brackett, Deborah Myers, and Sheriff Brackett, respectively. Although Daeg Faerch, who portrayed a young Michael Myers in the 2007 remake, was initially signed on to reprise his role for Halloween II (then known as H2), after filming briefly in Georgia as young Michael, he was later recast because he had grown taller. He was replaced by Chase Wright Vanek. Zombie had to recast the role, much to his own dismay, because Faerch's physical maturity did not fit what was in the script. Although Faerch is not in the sequel, the first trailer for Halloween II contained images of Faerch. Zombie pointed out that those images were test shots done and were not intended to be in either the trailer or the film.

Taylor-Compton described her character as having "these bipolar moments", where her emotions are spontaneously changing from points of happiness to agitation. The actress stated that Zombie wanted to see Laurie Strode travel into "these really dark places". Taylor-Compton clarified that when the film starts Laurie is still not aware that Michael is her older brother, and as the film progresses more and more pieces of information are given to her and she does not know how to deal with them. The actress explained that the darkness brewing inside Laurie is manifested externally, generally through her physical appearance and the clothes she chooses to wear—Zombie characterized the look as "grungy".

Instead of focusing on Michael, Zombie chose to look more at the psychological consequences on Laurie after the events of the remake. As Zombie explains, after Michael murdered her friends and family, Laurie became a "wreck", who continually sinks lower as the film moves forward. Even Sheriff Brackett goes through changes. Brackett, who receives more screen time in this film, allows Laurie to move in with him and his daughter after the events of the first film. Zombie explained, "He's old, he's worn out, he's just this beat-down guy with these two girls he can't deal with." Zombie characterized Loomis in the sequel as more of a "sellout", who exploits the memories of those who were killed by Michael in the 2007 film. Zombie explained that he tried to channel Vincent Bugliosi, a lawyer who prosecuted Charles Manson and then wrote a book about it, into Loomis's character for the sequel, noting that he wanted Loomis to seem more "ridiculous" this time. As for Michael Myers, the character is given almost an entirely new look for the film, which is being used, according to Taylor-Compton, to illustrate a new emotion for the character as he spends much of his time trying to hide himself. Zombie said that of all of the characters that return in the sequel, Michael is the only one that does not change: "All the other characters are very different. Laurie; Loomis; they're having all kinds of problems in their life, but Michael just moves along. Michael is no different; he's exactly the same as he was ten years old and he killed everybody [...] He has no concept of the world around him, so he can never be affected by it."

Filming
With a $15 million budget, production began on February 23, 2009, in Atlanta, Georgia. Zombie acknowledged that filming in Georgia provided certain tax breaks for the company, but the real reason he chose that location was because the other locations he was planning to use were still experiencing snowy weather. For him, Georgia's landscapes and locations provided the look that he wanted for his film. During production, Zombie described the sequel as being "Ultra gritty, ultra intense and very real" and said that he was trying to create almost the exact opposite of what people would expect. Known for filming multiple sequences during production of his films, Zombie filmed an alternate ending to Halloween II. In the alternate ending, Loomis and Michael crash through the shed the police have surrounded, and out into the open air. As Loomis grasps at Michael's mask, and pleads for him to stop, Michael stabs him in the stomach, telling him to "Die!". With Loomis injured and unconscious (it is not revealed whether he lived or died), the police open fire on Michael, killing him. Laurie, now completely insane, leaves the shack, picks up Michael's knife and walks over to Loomis' unconscious body. Against Brackett's orders, the police open fire on Laurie, apparently killing her too.

Music
For the sequel, Zombie only used Carpenter's original theme music in the final scene of the film, though the director admits that he and music composer Tyler Bates tried to find other places to include it. According to Zombie, Carpenter's music did not fit with what was happening in the film; whenever he or Bates would insert it into a scene it "just wouldn't feel right" to the director. Zombie also used popular culture songs throughout the film, with "Nights in White Satin" appearing the most prominently. Zombie chose songs that he liked, and that would enhance a given scene within the film. An official soundtrack for the film was released on August 25, 2009. In addition, an album featuring the music of psychobilly band Captain Clegg and the Night Creatures was released in conjunction with Halloween II on August 28, 2009. Captain Clegg and the Night Creatures is a fictional band that appears in Halloween II. Nan Vernon, who recorded a new version of the song "Mr. Sandman" for the end credits of the 2007 remake, recorded a cover of "Love Hurts" for Halloween II.

Release
Dimension Films released Halloween II in North America on August 28, 2009, to 3,025 theaters. Following that, the film was released in the United Kingdom on October 9, 2009. Dimension re-released Halloween II in North America on October 30, 2009, to coincide with the Halloween holiday, across 1,083 theaters. The film was released on DVD and Blu-ray on January 12, 2010; the theatrical cut and an unrated director's cut, which Zombie says is "very different from the theatrical version," are available. The Theatrical cut can only be purchased on Blu-ray in a Canadian double feature disc along with the theatrical cut of Halloween (2007).

Box office
On its opening day, the film grossed an estimated $7,640,000, which is less than the $10,896,610 Zombie's 2007 remake pulled in during the same weekend of August. By the end of its opening weekend, Halloween II had grossed $16,349,565. That weekend earned more than the entire box office performances of Halloween III: Season of the Witch ($14,400,000), Halloween 5: The Revenge of Michael Myers ($11,642,254), and Halloween: The Curse of Michael Myers ($15,116,634), in unadjusted dollars. The film dropped 64.9% in its second weekend, only grossing $5,745,206 and slipping from third to sixth place. Grossing just $2,114,486 in its third weekend, Halloween II dropped out of the box office top ten to fourteenth place. The re-release of the film was intended to take advantage of the Halloween holiday, but the film only brought in approximately $475,000. By the end of its theatrical run, Halloween II grossed a total of $33,392,973 in North America, and an additional $6,028,494 overseas for a worldwide total of $39,421,467. Compared to the other Halloween films, the 2009 sequel sits in fourth place, just behind the original Halloween.

Critical reception
Based on 81 reviews collected by Rotten Tomatoes, Halloween II has an overall 23% approval rating from critics, with an average score of 4.12 out of 10, with the general consensus reading "Zombie shows flashes of vision in the follow-up to his Halloween reboot, but they're smothered by mountains of gore and hackneyed, brutal violence." Rob Nelson, of Variety, felt the use of Deborah and the white horse was nothing more than "silly", and he disagreed with Zombie's choice to film Halloween II in 16mm film, as opposed to the wider format of 35mm that he used on his 2007 remake. Nelson also stated that the hospital scene was nothing more than a "butcher"-version of Carpenter's 1981 sequel, with the rest of the film feeling like it was rushed and "slapped together" at the last minute. In contrast, Time Out believed the hospital scene at the start of the film "[bested the 1981 sequel] in just about every respect". Time Out stated that Compton's portrayal of Laurie Strode showed an "intense, nontrivializing dedication to the role" that kept interest, while the storyline of Dr. Loomis's egocentricity hinders the overall storyline. Time Out also said that Zombie hurt the film by trying to show how "violence lingers with, and perverts, all who are touched by it", but then undercut himself with "carnivalesque" violence. Although the New York Post's Kyle Smith did not believe the character of Laurie Strode was a balance for Michael Myers or Dr. Loomis, he agreed the ghostly images of Deborah Myers were a "relief from the blood-streaked brutality" of Michael's murders.

The Boston Globe's Tom Russo had varied reactions to the film. Russo pointed out that Zombie attempted to be more inventive with Halloween II, but only achieved mixed results for his efforts. Russo referred to the dream sequences of Deborah Myers and the white horse as "pretentiously silly", but agreed that the scenes did help to break up the standard genre violence and even went so far as to compare the sensation created by those scenes to "Tim Burton doing straight horror". In the end, Russo claimed that "only the most hardcore fans" would want the film series to continue. Joe Neumaier, of the Daily News, stated that Zombie has found himself with Halloween II. Neumaier describes the film as a successful "'character-based' monster-flick". Zombie's use of music from the 1970s, like The Moody Blues' "Nights in White Satin" and 10cc's "The Things We Do for Love", is "terrifically odd" throughout the film. Neumaier also said that the imagery of Deborah Myers and the "ethereal white horse" were a "nice visual relief" from Michael's violent attacks.

Cancelled sequel
In 2009, Rob Zombie declined to return to direct the sequel to Halloween II. On August 30 that year, the next film in the series, Halloween 3D, was announced by The Weinstein Company and planned to be released in 2010, retroactively establishing Laurie to have killed Loomis instead of Michael. The film was ultimately cancelled as Bob and Harvey Weinstein decided to green light and prioritize Scream 4 (2011) instead. In 2016, Blumhouse Productions acquired the rights to the series. The next installment, 2018's Halloween, served as a direct sequel to the original 1978 and effected a retcon of previous sequels. Universal Pictures distributed the film.

References

External links

 
 
 
 
 
 

10
2009 films
2000s English-language films
2009 horror films
2000s slasher films
American sequel films
American slasher films
Films scored by Tyler Bates
Films directed by Rob Zombie
Films set in Illinois
Films set in 1992
Films set in 2007
Films set in 2008
Films shot in Georgia (U.S. state)
Dimension Films films
Films with screenplays by Rob Zombie
Films produced by Rob Zombie
The Weinstein Company films
2000s American films